Juliette is an opera by Bohuslav Martinů, who also wrote the libretto, in French, based on the play Juliette, ou La clé des songes (Juliette, or The Key of Dreams) by the French author Georges Neveux. A libretto in Czech was later prepared for its premiere which took place at the Prague National Theatre on 16 March 1938. Juliette has become widely considered as Martinů's masterpiece.

Performance history
It appears that Neveux had come to an agreement with Kurt Weill to base a musical comedy on his play, but on hearing some of Martinů's music, passed his favour to the Czech. The initial work on the opera was undertaken to French words, but a Czech version was set between May 1936 and January 1937.

By the time of its premiere Martinů had written eight operas in a variety of styles. The work received its first performance at Prague National Theatre on 16 March 1938 (as Julietta aneb Snář), with Václav Talich conducting, a few months before Martinů made his last visit to his country of birth. From Paris he wrote to Talich expressing his deep thanks to the conductor for his "understanding" which "showed all who worked with you the right path". Neveux had also been present at the premiere, adjudging the setting better than his prose original.

Subsequently the opera has only been intermittently performed at that house; new productions were mounted in 1963 and 1989, and an Opera North production was seen three times in 2000; in March 2016 a new production was premiered at the theatre, and performances are scheduled for its 80th anniversary in 2018.

The composer was present at the German premiere in Wiesbaden in January 1956. A production by the Bielefeld Opera in Germany conducted by Geoffrey Moull received eight performances in 1992. In France, a radio broadcast in 1962 was conducted by Charles Bruck, while the stage premiere was at the Grand Théâtre in Angers in 1970.

The UK premiere was given in April 1978 in London by the New Opera Company at the London Coliseum, conducted by Charles Mackerras in an English translation by Brian Large, with Joy Roberts and Stuart Kale in the principal roles, and it was revived by English National Opera in the following season. There was a production by the Guildhall School of Music and Drama in 1987 conducted by Howard Williams, with the title role shared between Juliet Booth and Sarah Pring. Following a performance at the Edinburgh Festival by a visiting Slovak company in 1990, the next UK production was by Opera North in 1997, with Rebecca Caine and Paul Nilon. A production by Richard Jones in Paris in 2002 was revived by English National Opera in September/October 2012 to enthusiastic reviews overall.

Germany's Theater Bremen staged a new production opening on 29 March 2014 under the direction of John Fulljames. Andreas Homoki and Fabio Luisi mounted a new production at Opernhaus Zürich with Joseph Kaiser as Michel in 2015 and the Berlin Staatsoper premiered a new production on 28 May 2016 at its temporary Schiller Theater home, with Daniel Barenboim conducting, Claus Guth directing, Magdalena Kožená as Juliette and Rolando Villazón as Michel.

Martinů's setting of his libretto is primarily lyrical although there are no extended solo arias. The "extended diatonicism" of the composer's mature works features along with "motoric rhythms found in his Double Concerto of 1938, especially where the plot moves rapidly forward.

Jan Smaczny observes that the ability of the composer to characterize, honed as an observer of small-town life when a child living in the Polička clock tower offers a sequence of "sharply painted tableaux" with a "carnival of caricatures", both comic and poignant. For the singers, there is the factor that significant sections of the piece are dialogue rather than singing, although Martinů's experience in a variety of theatre works before this, his ninth opera, allows him to weave the spoken words as an integral part of the impact of the opera, "distancing the audience from the often dreamlike quality of the musical fabric". A snatch of melody on an off-stage accordion, and a melodic fragment which symbolizes longing are introduced at key moments in the score. Smaczny comments that "suggestion is everything in this score, and Martinů is astonishingly successful at stimulating the imagination often with breathtaking economy".

The opera was one of the composer's favourite works, and he incorporated a few bars from it in his last symphony in 1953.

There are two principal roles: Juliette (soprano) and Michel (tenor). James Helmes Sutcliffe remarked in Opera News on "Martinů's beautiful score" and on his "lyrical, atmospheric music". Hindle and Godsil have published a psychoanalytical study of the opera and analysed the work in the context of Martinů's life.

The opera was revived at the Prague National Theatre on 16 March 2018, the 80th anniversary of its premiere.

Orchestral suite
Martinů began to prepare a concert work from the opera, "Three Fragments from Juliette", with changes to the original vocal lines, after the opera's premiere, after his return to Paris. However, the outbreak of World War II interrupted his work, and his own labours on this composition continued until his death in 1959. The score was lost after Martinů's death, until 2002, when Aleš Březina discovered the piano reduction of the score among a private collection of papers. After Březina returned to Prague to have this adapted into a full orchestral score, the Czech publishing firm DILIA revealed that a full score already existed in their archives. Sir Charles Mackerras conducted the world premiere of the "Three Fragments from Juliette" with the Czech Philharmonic Orchestra in December 2008.

Roles

Synopsis

Act 1
Michel, a traveling bookseller from Paris, finds himself in a seaside town in search of a girl whose voice has haunted him since first hearing it three years before. From the following scenes with various townspeople, it emerges that none of them can remember more than a few minutes, which is confirmed by a police officer. The policeman asks Michel what his oldest memory is – in fact, a toy duck. As he has such a good memory the townsfolk he is elected to be town captain, and the officer departs to prepare for his inauguration. As Michel (with just piano accompaniment) tells some townspeople of how he came to fall in love with the voice of the unknown girl, the voice of Juliette is heard and after her song she asks him to meet her later in the woods. The policeman returns as a postman with no recollection of his meeting with Michel.

Act 2
At a crossroads in the woods near a fountain, various people enter, all showing a lack of memory, including a fortune teller who forewarns Michel of something. When Juliette arrives she conjures a world of romantic fantasy and asks him to tell her of their (non-existent) past love. A peddlar comes by selling wares in which Juliette sees her past with Michel. She runs into the woods and Michel fires a shot at which the townspeople rush in to arrest him. He diverts them by telling them stories and they forget their intention to execute him and wander away. Back in the town square Michel locates Juliette's house, but an old woman says that she lives alone. He hears Juliette's song again, but decides to embark on a ship and leave.

Act 3
At the Central Bureau of Dreams several dreamers (the messenger, the beggar, the convict, the railway engineer) come to ask for their fantasy dream. Michel is warned that if he returns to his dream and does not wake up, he will be imprisoned in the dream-world forever. Ready to leave his dream, he hears Juliette's voice calling him and despite the nightwatchman's warning declares that he will stay with her. The setting and townsfolk from the start of the opera returns, and Michel remains in the dream-world.

Recordings
 Le Chant du Monde (1962, live in Paris): Andrée Esposito (Julietta), Jean Giraudeau (Michel), Charles Bruck
 Supraphon (1964) SU 3626-2 612: Maria Tauberová (Julietta), Ivo Žídek (Michel), Orchestra and Chorus of the Prague National Theatre; Jaroslav Krombholc, conductor, with Antonín Zlesák, Zdeněk Otava
 ORF (2002, live at Bregenz): Eva-Maria Westbroek (Julietta), Johannes Chum (Michel), Vienna Symphony Orchestra conducted by Dietfried Bernet
 Oehms Classics (2014 live, Frankfurt): Juanita Lascarro (Julietta), Kurt Streit (Michel), Frankfurt Opera conducted by Sebastian Weigle

References

Further reading
Holden, Amanda (Ed.), The New Penguin Opera Guide, New York: Penguin Putnam, 2001. 

Operas by Bohuslav Martinů
Czech-language operas
French-language operas
Operas based on plays
1938 operas
Operas